DTX (previously known as Discovery Turbo Xtra) is a television channel focused on programming about cars owned by Warner Bros. Discovery EMEA. It is a CEEMEA version of Discovery Turbo.

The channel was launched under the name Discovery Turbo Xtra to replace the European version of Discovery World, with the first launch in Poland on 17 September 2013. The channel roll-out in 2015 in Albania and in 2016 in Hungary, Romania, Czech Republic, Slovakia, Baltics, Russia, CIS, Ukraine, Turkey and MENA.  In the Middle East, it was launched on 1 April 2016 on beIN Network. 

In November 2016 Discovery Turbo Xtra has been rebranded as DTX.

On 9 March 2022, Discovery Inc. closed DTX in Russia due to Russia's invasion of Ukraine.

Current Programming 
 American Chopper
 American Hot Rod
 Biker Build-Off
 How It's Made
 Car Masters: Rust to Riches
 Cash Cab
 Chasing Classic Cars
 Dallas Car Sharks
 The Devils Ride
 Diesel Brothers
 Dirty Mudder Truckers
 Eat. Race. Win.
 Fast N' Loud
 Fastest Car
 Fifth Gear
 Formula 1: Drive to Survive
 The Grand Tour
 Graveyard Carz
 How It's Made: Dream Cars
 Ice Road Truckers
 Inside West Coast Customs
 Le Mans: Racing is Everything
 Misfit Garage
 Nitro Circus
 Overhaulin'
 Kindig Customs
 Pimp My Ride
 Street Outlaws
 Top Gear
 Trick My Truck
 Vegas Rat Rods
 Wheeler Dealers
 World of Outlaws Sprint Cars
 World Rally Championship

Upcoming Programming 
 Bitchin' Rides
 Hyperdrive

Former Programming 
 America's Worst Driver
 American Muscle Car
 American Trucker
 Auto Trader
 Bangla Bangers
 Britain's Worst Driver
 Bullrun
 Canada's Worst Driver
 Classic Car Rescue
 Desert Car Kings
 Dream Car Garage
 Driving Me Crazy
 Extreme Machines
 The Garage
 Harley and the Davidsons
 Iditarod: Toughest Race on Earth
 Knight Rider
 Lords of the Car Hoards
 Monster Garage
 NASCAR Angels
 NASCAR Racers
 One Car Too Far
 Pinks
 Some Assembly Required
 Street Customs
 Texas Car Wars
 Turbo Fast
 Unique Whips

References

Television channels and stations established in 2013
Television channels in North Macedonia
Warner Bros. Discovery networks
Warner Bros. Discovery EMEA